Richard Leite (born 16 September 1983 in Areguá, Paraguay) is a Paraguayan footballer currently playing for Independiente F.B.C. of the Primera División in Paraguay.

Teams
  12 de Octubre 2004–2007
  Sol de América 2007
  3 de Febrero 2008
  Sportivo Luqueño 2009
  Sport Huancayo 2009–2010
  Independiente F.B.C. 2011–present

References
 

1983 births
Living people
Paraguayan footballers
Paraguayan expatriate footballers
Independiente F.B.C. footballers
12 de Octubre Football Club players
Club Sol de América footballers
Sportivo Luqueño players
Sport Huancayo footballers
Expatriate footballers in Peru
People from Areguá
Association football midfielders